Rebecca Kilgore (born September 24, 1949) is an American jazz vocalist based in Portland, Oregon. She has been called "one of the best interpreters of the Great American Songbook." She has performed with jazz pianist and composer Dave Frishberg, trombonist Dan Barrett, tenor saxophonist Harry Allen, and many other musicians. She was inducted into the Oregon Music Hall of Fame in 2010.

Discography
 Looking at You with Dave Frishberg (PHD Music, 1994)
 I Saw Stars with Dave Frishberg (Arbors, 1994)
 Cactus Setup with Jim Mason (PHD, 1995)
 Not a Care in the World with Dave Frishberg (Arbors, 1996)
 Stealin' Apples with the California Swing Cats (Jazzology, 1997)
 It's Easy to Remember (Orb, 1998)
 Concentratin' on Fats (Jazzology, 1999)
 Moments Like This (Heavywood, 2001)
 The Starlit Hour with Dave Frishberg (Arbors, 2001)
 Rebecca Kilgore with the Keith Ingham Sextet (Jump, 2001)
 A Remembrance of Maxine Sullivan: Harlem Butterfly (Audiophile, 2001)
 Jump Presents the Music of Jimmy Van Heusen (Jump, 2005)
 Winter Warm with Tom Grant (2007)
 I Wish You Love with Lyle Ritz (2007)
 Why Fight the Feeling? (Arbors, 2008)
 Bossa Style with Lyle Ritz (2009)
 Rebecca Kilgore Sings the Music of Jerome Kern (Audiophile, 2010)
 Yes, Indeed! (Blue Swing, 2010)
 Just Imagine (Blue Swing, 2014)
 I Like Men (Arbors, 2014)
 Two Songbirds of a Feather with Nicki Parrott (Arbors, 2015)
 Moonshadow Dance (Cherry Pie Music, 2016)

With BED
 Get Ready for BED (Blue Swing, 2002)
 BEDlam (Blue Swing, 2004)
 Watch Out (Blue Swing, 2006)
 BED Four + 1 (2008)

With Wholly Cats
 Doggin' Around (1982)

As guest
With Harry Allen
 Harry Allen-Joe Cohn Quartet Performs Music from Guys and Dolls (Arbors, 2007)
 Harry Allen-Joe Cohn Quartet Plays Music from South Pacific (Arbors, 2009)
 Harry Allen Quintet Plays Music from The Sound of Music (Arbors, 2011)
 Live at Feinstein's at Loews Regency: Celebrating Lady Day and Prez (Arbors, 2011)

With Dan Barrett
 Moon Song (Arbors, 1998)
 Blue Swing (Arbors, 2000)
 Being a Bear: Jazz for the Whole Family (Arbors, 2000)

With Bucky Pizzarelli
 Back in the Saddle Again (Arbors, 2009)
 Diggin' Up Bones (Arbors, 2009)
 Pizarelli Party (Arbors, 2009)

With John Sheridan
 Dream Band, Make Me Some More (Arbors, 1999)
 Get Rhythm in Your Feet (Arbors, 2002)
 Easy as It Gets (Arbors, 2005)
 Hooray for Christmas (Arbors, 2010)

With others
 Lars Erstrand, Meets Rebecca Kilgore (Gemini, 2003)
 Dave Frishberg, Quality Time (Sterling, 1994)

References

External links
 Official website
Rifftides
 Oldies.com biography

1949 births
American women jazz singers
American jazz singers
Musicians from Portland, Oregon
People from Waltham, Massachusetts
Living people
Singers from Oregon
Jazz musicians from Massachusetts
Arbors Records artists
Jazzology Records artists
21st-century American women